Thesen is a surname. Notable people with the surname include:

Charles Wilhelm Thesen (1856–1940), Norwegian-born South African businessman
Johan Thesen (1867–1945), Norwegian businessman
Nils Peter Thesen (1853–1929), Norwegian-born South African businessman
Rolv Thesen (1896–1966), Norwegian poet, literary researcher and literary critic
Sharon Thesen (born 1946), Canadian poet